Bjarne Røtterud (29 August 1929 – 12 March 2011) was a Norwegian painter.

He was born in Nannestad. He took his education at the Norwegian National Academy of Craft and Art Industry and the Norwegian National Academy of Fine Arts. He lived in Paris from 1969, but died in Nannestad. He painted in abstract style from the late 1960s. His work is owned by the Norwegian Museum of Contemporary Art.

References

1929 births
2011 deaths
People from Nannestad
20th-century Norwegian painters
21st-century Norwegian painters
Norwegian male painters
Oslo National Academy of the Arts alumni
Norwegian expatriates in France
20th-century Norwegian male artists
21st-century Norwegian male artists